A list of films released in Japan in 1992 (see 1992 in film).

See also 
 1992 in Japan
 1992 in Japanese television

External links
 Japanese films of 1992 at the Internet Movie Database

1992
Japanese
Films